Lake Cascade State Park is a public recreation area consisting of multiple units totaling  around Lake Cascade, an impoundment of the North Fork of the Payette River that covers  in Valley County, Idaho, United States. The state park includes 279 individual campsites in 10 developed campgrounds, six boat ramps, and opportunities for hiking, fishing, ice fishing, skiing, and bird watching.

Wildlife
This state park is home to waterfowl, deer, rainbow trout, raccoon, eagles, black bear, owls, fox, songbirds, badger, coho salmon, elk, cougar, hawks, smallmouth bass, perch, grizzly bear and  skunk.

See also
 List of Idaho state parks
 National Parks in Idaho

References

External links
Lake Cascade State Park Idaho Parks and Recreation
Lake Cascade State Park Units Map Idaho Parks and Recreation

State parks of Idaho
Protected areas of Valley County, Idaho
Protected areas established in 1999